The Vinales anole (Anolis vermiculatus), also known as the Cuban stream anole, is a species of lizard in the family Dactyloidae, endemic to Cuba.

Range and habitat
A. vermiculatus is endemic to the Viñales region of Pinar del Río Province in western Cuba. It lives in densely vegetated and heavily shaded habitats close to water, typically streams.

Description and behavior
It is one of only two anoles that completely lacks a dewlap (both sexes), the other being the West Cuban anole.

A. vermiculatus is fast to retreat and will dive into water to escape potential enemies, reportedly sometimes staying submerged for almost an hour. It can also run bipedally across water, similar to A. lionotus, A. poecilopus and A. oxylophus (all often in Norops instead) from Central America and Colombia, as well as the basilisks. A. vermiculatus feeds on small animals like frogs, shrimp and fish, which often are caught in water. It is one of two semi-aquatic anoles from the Caribbean, the other being A. eugenegrahami of Hispaniola.

See also
List of Anolis lizards

References

Anoles
Lizards of the Caribbean
Reptiles of Cuba
Endemic fauna of Cuba
Reptiles described in 1837
Taxa named by Jean Theodore Cocteau